The 2002 FIVB Volleyball Men's World Championship was the 15th edition of the event, organised by the world's governing body, the FIVB. It was held in Salta, Córdoba, Mar del Plata, Buenos Aires, Santa Fé and San Juan in Argentina from September 28 to October 13, 2002. All times are Argentina Time (UTC−03:00).

Qualification

*  Due to the clash of dates with the 2002 Asian Games, South Korea withdrew from participating and instead was FIVB give a wildcard to Poland.

Pools composition

Squads

Venues
Estadio Aldo Cantoni (San Juan) – Pool A except Argentina vs. Australia
Estadio Ángel Malvicino (Santa Fé) – Pool B and J
Luna Park (Buenos Aires) – Argentina vs. Australia, Pool C, G and Final round
Estadio Polideportivo (Mar del Plata) – Pool D
Orfeo Superdomo (Córdoba) – Pool E, H and Final round
Polideportivo Delmi (Salta) – Pool F and K

First round

Pool A

|}

|}

Pool B

|}

|}

Pool C

|}

|}

Pool D

|}

|}

Pool E

|}

|}

Pool F

|}

|}

Third placed teams

|}

Second round

Pool G

|}

|}

Pool H

|}

|}

Pool J

|}

|}

Pool K

|}

|}

Final round

Quarterfinals

|}

5th–8th semifinals

|}

Semifinals

|}

7th place

|}

5th place

|}

3rd place

|}

Final

|}

Final standing

Awards
MVP:  Marcos Milinkovic
Best Scorer:  Marcos Milinkovic
Best Spiker:  André Nascimento
Best Blocker:  João José
Best Server:  Franz Granvorka
Best Setter:  Maurício Lima
Best Digger:  Hubert Henno
Best Receiver:  Pablo Meana

Super seven selection
Setter:  Nikola Grbić
Outside Hitters:  Sergey Tetyukhin and  Stéphane Antiga
Middle Blockers:  Gustavo and  João José
Opposite:  Marcos Milinkovic
Libero:  Hubert Henno

Marketing

Symbol
The official competition symbol the "Minto". The design is based on sport ball and volleyball.

Sponsors
Cerveza Quilmes
Visa
Saputo Inc.

Broadcasting

External links

Official website
Final Standing
Awards
Formula

W
V
V
FIVB Volleyball Men's World Championship
 Sports competitions in Buenos Aires